Anti-twister can mean:

 Anticyclonic tornado, a type of tornado
 Anti-twister mechanism, a mechanism that allows continuous rotation of an object attached by a link